The 1992 Boston Red Sox season was the 92nd season in the franchise's Major League Baseball history. The Red Sox finished last in the seven-team American League East with a record of 73 wins and 89 losses, 23 games behind the Toronto Blue Jays, who went on to win the 1992 World Series. It was the last time the Red Sox finished last in their division until 2012. From 1933-2011, this was the only season the Red Sox finished last in the division.

Offseason
 January 2, 1992: Frank Viola signed as a free agent with the Red Sox.

Regular season

The Red Sox hit seven grand slams, the most in MLB in 1992.

Season standings

Record vs. opponents

Notable transactions
 April 16, 1992: Bob Geren was signed as a free agent with the Red Sox.
 June 27, 1992: Steve Lyons was purchased by the Red Sox from the Montreal Expos.
 August 30, 1992: Jeff Reardon was traded by the Red Sox to the Atlanta Braves for Nate Minchey and minor league outfielder Sean Ross.
 October 26, 1992: Wade Boggs was granted free agency by the Red Sox.

Opening Day lineup

Source:

Alumni game
The team held an old-timers game on May 16, before a scheduled home game against the California Angels. The game marked the 25th anniversary of the 1967 Boston Red Sox season, known as "The Impossible Dream"; participants from the 1967 team included Mike Andrews, Jim Lonborg, Rico Petrocelli, and Carl Yastrzemski. Red Sox alumni won by a 3–0 score over a team of MLB alumni from other clubs, managed by Harmon Killebrew.

Roster

Player stats

Batting

Starters by position 
Note: Pos = Position; G = Games played; AB = At bats; H = Hits; Avg. = Batting average; HR = Home runs; RBI = Runs batted in

Other batters 
Note: G = Games played; AB = At bats; H = Hits; Avg. = Batting average; HR = Home runs; RBI = Runs batted in

Pitching

Starting pitchers 
Note: G = Games pitched; IP = Innings pitched; W = Wins; L = Losses; ERA = Earned run average; SO = Strikeouts

Relief and other pitchers 
Note: G = Games pitched; IP = Innings pitched; W = Wins; L = Losses; ERA = Earned run average; SO = Strikeouts; SV = Saves

Awards and honors
Awards
Roger Clemens, AL Pitcher of the Month (May, August)

Accomplishments
Roger Clemens, American League Leader, Shutouts (5)

All-Star Game
Wade Boggs, third base, starter
Roger Clemens, pitcher, reserve

Farm system

Source:

References

External links
1992 Boston Red Sox team page at Baseball Reference
1992 Boston Red Sox season at baseball-almanac.com

Boston Red Sox seasons
Boston Red Sox
Boston Red Sox
Red Sox